Atractus nicefori, the northern ground snake, is a species of snake in the family Colubridae. The species can be found in Colombia. It is oviparous.

References 

Atractus
Reptiles of Colombia
Endemic fauna of Colombia
Snakes of South America
Reptiles described in 1930
Taxa named by Afrânio Pompílio Gastos do Amaral